Setup (the noun) or set up (the verb) may refer to:

Arts, entertainment, and media

Films
Set Up (2005 film), a 2005 Hong Kong horror film
Setup (2011 film), a 2011 action thriller heist film

Music
Setup (album), a 1994 album by jazz pianist Stanley Cowell
Setup (music)

Sports
Racing setup, in auto racing
Setup pitcher

Other uses
Setup (storytelling), the introduction in a plot of an element that will be useful to the story only later, when the payoff comes
Setup, also called frameup, providing false evidence or false testimony in order to falsely prove someone guilty of a crime
Setup, installation (computer programs)
Setup, power-on self-test
Setup, on page 104 of The_Black_Ice, delivery of an alcoholic drink in a bar
Setup cost, the cost of a step in manufacturing changeover

See also
Setting up to fail, a manipulative technique to engineer failure
Set (disambiguation)
Setting (disambiguation)
The Set-Up (disambiguation)